The ARRL International Humanitarian Award is an award by the American Radio Relay League given to 
amateurs who, through Amateur Radio, are devoted to promoting the Welfare of mankind.

Its criteria state that
Any licensed radio amateur world-wide, or group of amateurs, who by use of Amateur Radio skills has provided extraordinary service for the benefit of others in times of crisis or disaster, is qualified to receive the award.

Nobable Radio Amateurs who received the ARRL International Humanitarian Award 
 Father Moran 9N1MM, 1986

External links 
 ARRL International Humanitarian Award criteria

International Humanitarian Award
Humanitarian and service awards